Nighthawk is a steel flying roller coaster from Vekoma located at Carowinds amusement park. The roller coaster is located in the Celebration Plaza section of the park. The roller coaster originally opened as Stealth at California's Great America on April 1, 2000. In 2003, Paramount Parks decided to relocate the roller coaster to Carowinds. It reopened as Borg Assimilator – the first coaster in the world to be themed to Star Trek – on March 20, 2004. After Cedar Fair purchased Carowinds in 2006, Paramount themes were soon removed from the park, and the ride was renamed Nighthawk. It is one of only two Flying Dutchman models still in existence from Vekoma.

History

California's Great America (2000–2003)

On June 22, 1999, California's Great America announced Stealth as "the world's first true flying coaster." For Stealth to be installed, the lower flume of Logger's Run had to be altered and the Yankee Clipper had to be removed. The ride officially opened to the public on April 1, 2000.

Stealth faced many issues during its run in California. The most notable of these was the electrical box, which monitored the restraints and locking devices that allowed the cars to raise and lower. It was placed on each train instead of being located in the electrical room. This created stress on the ride vehicles and components.

On August 21, 2003, the park announced that Stealth would close on September 1 to make room for a new water park, Boomerang Bay (now known as South Bay Shores). The station is still located in the water park today as the queue for the water slides (Coastal Cruz, NorCal Wipeout, and Mission Falls).

Carowinds (2004–present)
In 1984, Carowinds added Smurf Island, which was a children's play area located on the  island surrounded by the Carolina Sternwheeler. In the 1990s, Smurf Island was eventually closed and later demolished to make space for a new ride.

On August 21, 2003, Carowinds announced a new flying roller coaster that would be relocated from California's Great America. The ride's name was not announced at the time. On January 15, 2004, it was announced the new roller coaster would be named Borg Assimilator and would be the first Star Trek themed roller coaster. Regarding the design of the attraction, Dale Kaetzel, Vice President of marketing and Assistant General Manager, said:

Borg Assimilator subsequently replaced the Carolina Sternwheeler Riverboat, a paddle boat ride that took riders around the seven themed areas of the park. Some modifications were made to the ride prior to opening. Park engineers worked out the prototype bugs and the electrical box was redesigned. It officially opened to the public on March 20, 2004.

Cedar Fair Entertainment Company purchased Carowinds in 2006 and was offered to use the rights of all Paramount properties for ten years at a nominal fee. The Cedar Fair Entertainment Company declined and renamed all Paramount-branded roller coasters, including Borg Assimilator. In 2008, the park renamed several attractions including Borg Assimilator. It was renamed to Nighthawk and the Star Trek theming was removed, including the black sphere that was in the pond underneath the ride. In 2009, Nighthawk was painted with dark blue supports and yellow track.

Ride experience

Track

While at California's Great America, the track was painted red and white with steel gray supports. When the ride was relocated to Carowinds, the track was repainted black and green and the supports remained gray. After the name was changed in 2008, the ride was once again repainted with yellow track and blue supports.

Nighthawk has a total of five inversions. It features one vertical loop, a double corkscrew, two "Lie to Fly" and two "Fly to Lie" elements. Each "Lie to Fly" and "Fly to Lie" element is counted as a half inversion. A "Lie to Fly" element is when riders are on their backs, facing the sky and they are flipped and face the ground. A "Fly to Lie" element is the opposite.

Layout
Once riders are seated and restrained, the train tilts backwards into a 'lay-down' position and is dispatched. The train travels backwards out of the station, turns left and travels up the  lift hill. Once the train reaches the top of the lift hill, it dips down into a twist (called a "Lie-to-Fly") that turns the trains upside down into a flying position where riders face the ground. Riders then go through an over banked Horseshoe Curve element. Following the Horseshoe, the train enters a "Fly-to-Lie" element that turns riders back to a lay-down position. The train then goes into another "Lie-to-Fly" element. Following the loop, riders go through another turn into the final "Fly-to-Lie" element before entering two consecutive corkscrews before making a right turn onto the brake run.

Theme

While the ride was located at Paramount's Great America, there was no theme for the ride. When it was relocated to Carowinds in 2004, it was built as the first Star Trek themed roller coaster in the world. It was renamed Borg Assimilator and the story was that "Borg crash-landed in the middle of Carowinds and their ship – a giant gray and black sphere – has come to rest near the park's new flying roller coaster." There was a gray and black sphere located in the pond underneath the ride that the Borg crashed in. In addition to other theming, a voice was played surrounding the ride saying Borg quotes. After Cedar Fair bought the park, all the Star Trek theming was removed and the name was changed for the 2008 season.

Trains
Nighthawk currently operates with two trains. Each train has six cars that have four seats in a single row for a total of 24 riders. Riders are restrained by an over the shoulder restraint and a lap bar. Riders can put on the over the shoulder restraint but a ride operator will push down the lap bar. While in the station, the trains will recline back to the laying down position.

Incidents 

On March 17, 2007, seven employees received minor injuries when their seats changed position during a test run of the roller coaster. An inspection discovered that the ride operator accidentally pushed a button controlling the seat positions while the ride was in motion. That button was later modified to only work when the ride is stopped.

See also 
Batwing (roller coaster), another Vekoma Flying Dutchman at Six Flags America

References

External links 

Official Nighthawk page
Documentary of Stealth at Great America
 

Roller coasters in South Carolina
Roller coasters operated by Cedar Fair
Roller coasters introduced in 2004
Carowinds
Amusement rides that closed in 2003